Sayeedullah Nongrum is an Indian politician and philanthropist. He was a three-time MLA for Rajabala constituency at the Meghalaya Legislative Assembly.

Early life and education
Khan was born on 25 November 1945 to a Sunni Muslim Khasi family in Meghalaya. His father was S.K. Abdullah. He began his studies in Shillong, completing his matriculation from the city's Islamia High School in 1960. He graduated from Gauhati University in 1964, and completed a Master of Arts degree in Urdu in 1969.

Career 
Nongrum began his career as a time scale clerk in the Department of Telecommunications Department in 1967. He later served as Public Relations Officer before retiring in 1992. He was the president of the Shillong Muslim Panchayat. Nongrum was also the secretary of Islamia High School's managing committee from 1983 to 1985 and elected secretary of the Meghalaya Waqf Board. He was the inaugural vice-president of Unishyrpi College's governing body. In 1990, he was the founding president of Qazi and Zaman College in Bhaitbari and ten years later, the Jinjiram College in Rajabala.

Despite being an independent candidate, he defeated Bharatiya Janata Party candidate Biren Hajong at the 1993 Meghalaya Legislative Assembly election for Rajabala constituency. However, he was defeated by Indian National Congress candidate Kapin Ch. Boro at the 1998 Meghalaya Legislative Assembly election. Nongrum made a comeback at the 2003 Meghalaya Legislative Assembly election, defeating Clement Marak of the Nationalist Congress Party. He managed to preserve his seat at Rajabala during the 2008 Meghalaya Legislative Assembly election, but was defeated in the 2013 Meghalaya Legislative Assembly election. At the 2018 Meghalaya Legislative Assembly election, Nongrum contested for the Tikrikilla constituency but was unsuccessful. A by-election was held in April 2019 for the Selsella constituency and Nongrum contested as a United Democratic Party candidate but did not win the election.

Nongrum is also a co-ordinator of the Assam-Meghalaya Boundary Settlement Committee, and chairman of the Meghalaya Industrial Development Corporation and the Meghalaya Land Revenue Review Committee. As the General Secretary of the Shillong Muslim Union since 1982, he played an important role in the establishment of Madina Mosque, Shillong, India's first glass mosque.

Personal life
Nongrum is married to Fatima Begum Dkhar (Florabell Dkhar), and they have two sons and two daughters. He is also a polyglot; fluent in Khasi, English, Bengali, Urdu, Hindi, Persian, Tamil,  Nepali and Assamese.

References

Indian National Congress politicians from Meghalaya
Meghalaya MLAs 1993–1998
1945 births
People from West Garo Hills district
20th-century Indian Muslims
Indian Sunni Muslims
Khasi people
Gauhati University alumni
Living people